Gerhard Jacobus van den Heever (born 13 April 1989) is a South African-born Japanese rugby union player for the  in Super Rugby and Kubota Spears in the Top League. His regular playing position is as a wing.

Education
Van den Heever attended Afrikaanse Hoër Seunskool (Afrikaans High School for Boys, known as Affies), in Pretoria — a school that produced several sports stars such as Bulls players Derick Kuun, Pierre Spies and Jacques-Louis Potgieter and Titans cricketers AB de Villiers, Heino Kuhn and Faf du Plessis. He played in the University Seven's Rugby World Championships for the University of Pretoria.

Bulls
In early 2010, Van den Heever inherited Bryan Habana's number 11 shirt in the Bulls team after Habana's departure for the Stormers; Van den Heever is said to be even quicker than Habana.

Stormers
On 24 October 2011, Van den Heever left the Bulls to join the Stormers and Western Province.

Munster
Van den Heever agreed to join Irish side Munster on a two-year contract after the 2013 Currie Cup Premier Division. He arrived in Cork to join up with Munster on 5 November 2013. He made his debut for Munster on 29 November 2013, starting against Newport Gwent Dragons in the Pro12, but sustained a broken bone in his hand during the game. Van den Heever scored his first try for Munster in their 54–13 win against Cardiff Blues on 8 February 2014. He was added to Munster's 2013–14 Heineken Cup squad on 20 March 2014. He made his Heineken Cup debut on 5 April 2014, coming on against Toulouse in Munster's quarter-final. In May 2016, it was announced that Van den Heever would be leaving Munster.

Yamaha Júbilo
After leaving Munster, Van den Heever played for Japanese Top League side Yamaha Júbilo from 2016 to early 2018.

Achievements
 2009 Currie Cup winner with the Blue Bulls
 2010 Super Rugby winner with the Bulls
 2012 Currie Cup winner with Western Province

References

External links
Munster Profile

Stormers Profile
Western Province Profile
Pro12 Profile
itsrugby.co.uk Profile

Living people
1989 births
South African rugby union players
Bulls (rugby union) players
Blue Bulls players
Rugby union fullbacks
Rugby union wings
University of Pretoria alumni
Stormers players
Western Province (rugby union) players
Munster Rugby players
Rugby union players from Bloemfontein
Afrikaner people
South Africa Under-20 international rugby union players
Shizuoka Blue Revs players
South African expatriate rugby union players
Expatriate rugby union players in Japan
South African expatriate sportspeople in Japan
Sunwolves players
Kubota Spears Funabashi Tokyo Bay players